Doloni Bill (also spelled as Doloni Beel) is a village in the Balapara panchayat of the Bongaigaon district in Assam, India.

References 

Villages in Bongaigaon district